Keesha Ulricka Sharp (née Fleth; born June 9, 1973) is an American actress and film / television director. She began her career appearing on television dramas, before her regular role as Monica Charles Brooks in the UPN/The CW comedy series, Girlfriends (2002–08), for which she received NAACP Image Award for Outstanding Supporting Actress in a Comedy Series nomination.

Sharp later has appeared in films include American Adobo (2002), Why Did I Get Married? (2007), and from 2010 to 2013 co-starred in the TBS sitcom, Are We There Yet?. In 2016, she played Dale Cochran, the wife of Johnnie Cochran, in the FX anthology drama series, The People v. O. J. Simpson: American Crime Story. From 2016 to 2019, Sharp starred as Trish Murtaugh in the Fox police comedy-drama series, Lethal Weapon, for which she received NAACP Image Award for Outstanding Actress in a Comedy Series nomination.

Life and career
Sharp was born in Rochester, New York. After graduating cum laude from The Boston Conservatory, Sharp set her sights on the stage. She performed in the Broadway National Tour of Carousel, debuted Off-Broadway in Michael Bradford's Living in the Wind and played eight different roles in the interactive comedy Eat the Runt. Other theatre performances include Abyssinia, Aida, Thunder Knockin, Jitney, The Producers, Big Street, Suburb and Joe Turner's Come and Gone. On television, she guest starred on Welcome to New York, Third Watch, and Law & Order: Special Victims Unit, before moving to Los Angeles.

In 2002, Sharp was cast on the CW comedy series Girlfriends, which she played William Dent's (Reggie Hayes) girlfriend, and later wife, Monica. Her role garnered a nomination for an NAACP Image Award for Outstanding Supporting Actress in a Comedy Series. The series ended in 2008. From 2005 to 2006, she also had the recurring role on Everybody Hates Chris as Sheila Ridenhour. Sharp also had roles in films Malibu's Most Wanted, Leprechaun: Back 2 tha Hood,  Never Die Alone and Why Did I Get Married?.

After Girlfriends, Sharp had guest starring roles on The Game, Cold Case, Melissa & Joey, Elementary and The Exes. From 2010 to 2012, she was regular cast member on the TBS sitcom, Are We There Yet?. In 2015, Sharp was cast as Dale Cochran, the wife of Johnnie Cochran (played by Courtney B. Vance), in the FX anthology drama series, American Crime Story. In 2016, she was cast in a series regular role opposite Damon Wayans Sr. in the Fox series Lethal Weapon playing Trish Murtaugh (played by Darlene Love in the Lethal Weapon film series). Golden Brooks, her Girlfriends co-star, originally was cast in the role, but was replaced by Sharp during filming of pilot episode. Later that year, she was cast as Thurgood Marshall's wife in the biographical film Marshall starring Chadwick Boseman.

In 2018, Sharp has picked up rights to John Williams’ 2013 biography America’s Mistress: The Life and Times of Eartha Kitt. She set to star as Kitt and will produce film alongside her husband, Brad Sharp.

In 2019, Sharp was cast in the final season of the Fox musical drama series Empire.

In 2022, Sharp joined the third season of Power Book II: Ghost as a series regular.

Personal life
Sharp married actor and singer-songwriter Brad Sharp on August 1, 1997. The couple have been together since high school and have a son named Solomon.

Filmography

Film

Television

Directing

Awards and nominations

References

External links

African-American actresses
American film actresses
American television actresses
Living people
21st-century American actresses
1973 births
Boston Conservatory at Berklee alumni
21st-century African-American women
21st-century African-American people
20th-century African-American people
20th-century African-American women